, also known as Le Avventure di "Lupin III": Lupin la Morte, Zenigata l'Amore in Italy, is a stealth/action video game based on the manga and media franchise Lupin III developed by Banpresto for the PlayStation 2. The game was originally published by Banpresto in Japan on February 22, 2007 and later localized for the Italian market only and published by 505 Games in Italy on February 15, 2008.

Gameplay
The game is divided in two narrative lines leading to four potential endings. The player controls either Lupin III or Inspector Zenigata; when controlling the former, the game offers a stealth gameplay, where the player must inspect surrounding areas looking for clues and escape from the police in order to progress with the story. While when controlling Zenigata, the gameplay becomes more action, with fighting and shooting sequences against hordes of enemies.
Jigen, Goemon and Fujiko are also playable characters during several of the available mini-games throughout the story.

Story
Set in the ancient Asian capital Sokai, Lupin III, together with Jigen and Goemon, come to rescue Fujiko who has been kidnapped by the Gang of the Celestial Dragon. The leader of the gang, Kourin, fights Lupin III with a mysterious technique that leaves the thief with only three days to live.
Zenigata also arrives in Sokai to protect the mysterious Ginrei, a beautiful girl raised in the royal family of the country.

Characters
 Arsène Lupin III: The Master thief, constantly being pursued by his ICPO nemesis, Inspector Zenigata. In Japanese, Lupin was voiced by Kanichi Kurita, while in Italian, he was voiced by Roberto Del Giudice.
 Daisuke Jigen: A master of arms. He carries his Smith & Wesson 45 Magnum wherever he goes. In Japanese, Jigen was voiced by Kiyoshi Kobayashi, while in Italian, he was voiced by Sandro Pellegrini.
 Goemon Ishikawa XIII: A descendant of the Ishikawa family, a group of thieves. In Japanese, Goemon was voiced by Makio Inoue, while in Italian, he was voiced by Massimo Rossi.
 Fujiko Mine: A cunning thief and Lupin's love interest. In Japanese, Fujiko was voiced by Eiko Masuyama, while in Italian, she was voiced by Piera Vidale.
 Inspector Koichi Zenigata: Chases Lupin wherever he goes. He is determined to capture him. In Japanese, Zenigata was voiced by Gorō Naya, while in Italian, he was voiced by Rodolfo Bianchi.
 Kourin: Leader of the Gang of the Celestial Dragon capable of lethal secret techniques. He's a cold-blooded murderer. In Japanese, Kourin was voiced by Ryōtarō Okiayu, while in Italian, he was voiced by Federico Zanandrea.
 Ginrei: Born and bred in Sokai, member of the royal family, wears the precious bracelet kept safe by the women of her family. In Japanese, Ginrei was voiced by Mamiko Noto, while in Italian, she was voiced by Renata Bertolas.

See also 

 List of Lupin III video games

References

External links 

Game
 Japanese official site
 
 

2007 video games
Banpresto games
Lupin the 3rd: Lupin is dead, Zenigata is in love
PlayStation 2 games
PlayStation 2-only games
Stealth video games
Video games about police officers
Video games based on anime and manga
Video games developed in Japan
505 Games games
Single-player video games